The Passion of the Hood Christ is the second studio album by Wu-Tang Clan affiliated rapper Shabazz the Disciple.

Track listing
 "The Passion of the Hood Christ (Opening)"
 "The One"
 "Losing My Religion"
 "Prayfemy"
 "Welcome Home G.F. (skit)"
 "Stunnaz" (featuring Duss Smitty and D. Snubs)
 "Preme"
 "Heavenly Bride"
 "Marion"
 "Angel Tearz"
 "Organized Rime"
 "Stone Him (skit)"
 "The One (Hood Christ Mix)"
 "Red Hood Day (Remix)" (featuring Tara Chase)
 "Hip Pop (Remix)"
 "Crime Saga (Remix)"
 "Organized Rime Pt. 2 (Remix)"
 "The Lamb's Blood (Remix)"
 "Same Niggas" (featuring J Dot R, R.H. Bless and Frances Elizee)
 "Kiss of Betrayal (Hug of Judas)"

The Passion of the Hood Christ: The DVD vol.1 40 Lashes is a DVD documentary with the same title of the album, that gives live show footage and interviews of Big Mike, Dj Nino Carta, J.Ronin and many more in Red Hook, Brooklyn. Sold exclusively at the Killa Beez 10th anniversary European Tour. There was only limited copies of 1000 pressed.  This Documentary is by Wu-Tang Clan affiliated rapper Shabazz the Disciple.

Track listing
 "Intro By Kalief" 
 "Welcome To Red Hook" 
 "Thieves (Video)" 
 "Hood Love"
 "Big Mike"
 "99 Cent Dreams"
 "Marion Video"
 "Calio & Bola Speaks On Wu-Tang"
 "Real Talk with Ready Roc"
 "Memories Of Preme"
 "Preme"
 "R.H. Bless Speak on Wu-Tang"
 "Pee Wee In Redhook" 
 "Pump Speaks On Wu-Tang"
 "'N.P.P' & 'The One' (Live)"
 "Interview w/Dj Nino Carta & J.Ronin Pt.1"
 "Diary Of A Madman (Live)"
 "Crime Saga (Live)"
 "Interview w/Dj Nino Carta & J.Ronin Pt.2"
 "Stunnaz"

Shabazz the Disciple albums
2006 albums